Highway 7, known for most of its length as the Lougheed Highway and Broadway, is an alternative route to Highway 1 through the Lower Mainland region of British Columbia. Whereas the controlled-access Highway 1 follows the southern bank of the Fraser River, Highway 7 follows the northern bank.

Highway 7 was first commissioned in 1941, and originally went from Vancouver to Harrison Hot Springs, following Dewdney Trunk Road between Port Moody and Port Coquitlam. In 1953, Highway 7 was moved to its current alignment between Vancouver and Coquitlam. Its eastern end was moved south from Harrison Hot Springs to Agassiz in 1956, and then east to Ruby Creek in 1968. Since September 1972, Highway 7 has travelled to a junction with Highway 1 just north of Hope.

The name of the highway, unlike that of Alberta Premier Peter Lougheed,  is pronounced . The highway is named after Nelson Seymour Lougheed, MLA for the Dewdney District and the BC Minister of Public Works (1928–1929), who ran a logging company in the area.

Route details

Highway 7's total length under the jurisdiction of the British Columbia Ministry of Transportation (MOT) is 118 km (73 mi). Highway 7 is signed as far west as Granville Street on Broadway in Vancouver, all the way east through Burnaby into Coquitlam, which is under the jurisdiction of the South Coast British Columbia Transportation Authority (TransLink). The section under the MOT's jurisdiction begins at the westbound exit with Highway 1 near Schoolhouse Street, with a total length of 2.3 km (1.4 mi). The highway then turns immediately northeast, meets with Highway 1 at the Cape Horn Interchange, and has an exit with United Boulevard. The highway leaves the MOT's jurisdiction 300 m (1000 ft) after the interchange. TransLink again has jurisdiction of Highway 7 from the point east of Ottawa Street to the point east of United Boulevard.

Highway 7 falls under the MOT's jurisdiction again after Ottawa Street, crossing over the Pitt River Bridge into Pitt Meadows. 6 km (4 mi) southeast of the Pitt River bridge, it crosses into Maple Ridge at Maple Meadows Way, and the highway then crosses into Mission another 20 km (12 mi) east. 9 km (6 mi) of Highway 7's entry into Mission, it meets a junction with Highway 11. 8 km (5 mi) east of the Highway 11 junction, Highway 7 leaves Mission over the Hatzic Pump Bridge.

27 km (17 mi) east of the Highway's eastern exit from Mission, Highway 7 enters the Municipality of Kent. 14 km (9 mi) east, it reaches a junction with Highway 9 at Agassiz. 18 km (11 mi) northeast of the Highway 9 junction, it leaves Kent. Another 12 km (7 mi) northeast, Highway 7 finally reaches its eastern terminus at a junction with Highway 1 at Haig, just across the Fraser River from the main part of Hope.

History
Lougheed Highway, as it exists today is the direct successor to the Dewdney Trunk Road, which was completed around 1900. Portions of the Lougheed in fact, were a part of Dewdney Trunk Road.
A subsidized ferry service across the Pitt River was instigated on September 27, 1902, and was replaced in March 1915 by the first Pitt River Bridge.  In the mid 1920s, the section from Harrison Mills to Agassiz over Woodside Mountain was built, being completed by the end of the 1926/27 fiscal year. This also included a bridge over the Harrison River. Around 1929 portions of the highway which followed Nicomen Slough were relocated.

From 1928 to 1931, contractors and the Public Works Department built in sections what is now the present alignment of Lougheed Highway from the Pitt River Bridge through to Mission. The route followed the already existing powerlines in Pitt Meadows, went through Haney and then followed the Fraser River to Mission. Ideas for the 240 St. to 285 St. section can be traced back to as early as 1919.
Around the time of the construction of today's Lougheed through Pitt Meadows and Maple Ridge, construction of what was then called the "Central Arterial Highway" started through Burnaby. The provincial government however, failed to complete the entire projected road and it wouldn't be until 1946 that the effort to build the road recommenced. The missing link in the road from what is now Lakeside Drive to North Road was completed by June 1948.

On August 14, 1950, the present truss bridge that carries eastbound traffic over the Coquitlam River was officially opened by Roderick Charles MacDonald. 

In September 1954, the section of Lougheed through the flats south of Maillardville and around Cape Horn was opened in a two-lane configuration. Previously, the highway followed streets that now make up both Brunette and Cape Horn Avenues.

In 1957 several bridges including the first Pitt River Bridge and the bridge at Harrison Mills were replaced. W. A. C. Bennett opened the new Pitt River and Harrison River Bridges on October 21. Around that time via the Mt. Woodside section was improved significantly. Work on the Agassiz-Haig Highway was also sought over.
Around 1958, the highway was widened to four lanes from Boundary Road to North Road, entirely in Burnaby.

In the 1970s, several sections of the highway were widened from Coquitlam to Maple Ridge. In 1971 or early 1972, work to widen the highway to four lanes from Cape Horn to Pitt River Road was completed. The Agassiz-Haig section of the highway was finally opened in September 1972 after many years of construction and want. By early 1973 the segment from the Pitt River Bridge to Haney had also been widened to a four-lane standard.

From about 1953 and up until 1975, Highway 7 followed Westwood Street from today's Orchid Street intersection, over the now-gone Scott Creek bridge and along Coquitlam/Port Coquitlam border to the intersection with Barnet Highway. This portion was replaced by the Sharpe Street Extension which completed and opened on September 5, 1975.

In 1981 work to widen the North Road to Cape Horn Interchange section was completed. Work on widening of the section of highway from Haney to Albion was being done during the early to mid-eighties.  

Through the 1990s, efforts were made to widen the highway from Albion to Mission. In 1991 and 1992, the section between  Highway 11 and Grant Street was widened to four lanes for $4,571,000.
In 1992 and 1993, the highway was widened to four lanes from the western boundary of Langley I.R. 5 to Whonnock for $12.7 million

In 1999, portions of Highway 7 and a former alignment were devolved to the municipalities of Burnaby, Coquitlam, Port Coquitlam, and Maple Ridge.

Around 2001, work to widen Lougheed highway from Brunette Avenue to Schoolhouse Street in Coquitlam to a six-lane cross section was completed. From October 2004 to about November 2005 the section from 285 Street to Mclean Street in Silverdale was widened to four lanes. In 2011, widening of the highway to four lanes from Wren street to Nelson street was completed.

From May 2018 to July 2020, work was underway to widen the portion of highway between Nelson Street and the Silverdale area in Mission. The project was completed successfully. , only one section remains to be widened to four lanes from Vancouver to Mission. This section, from 266 St. to 287 St. is, as of December 2022, under construction.

2021 floods
On November 14, 2021, the province experienced extreme rainfall events that led to debris flows and flooding. As a result, two mudslides occurred late that evening near Seabird Island on the Agassiz-Haig section of the highway, trapping nearly 100 vehicles between the two slides. The next day, Canadian military personnel used helicopters to safely transport over 300 people to Agassiz.

Major intersections
From west to east:

References

Footnotes

Roads in Burnaby
007
Transport in Coquitlam
007